St. Luke is an oil-on-canvas  painting by the Dutch Golden Age painter Frans Hals, painted in 1625 and now in the Odessa Museum of Western and Eastern Art.

Painting 
The painting shows St. Luke sitting at a desk reading with an ox at his elbow. This painting was documented in the 18th century but was considered lost until the 1950s, when two tronies were discovered languishing in the storerooms of the Odessa Museum of Western and Eastern Art in 1958 by art historian Irina Linnik. At the time they were considered to be by unknown 19th-century painters, but Linnik recognized them as the work of a 17th-century master and eventually traced their history back to the 17th century, identifying them as two of four lost paintings by Hals of the evangelists, namely Luke and Matthew. After her work was published in 1959, the two paintings were included in the 1962 Frans Hals exhibition in the Frans Hals Museum. The international attention helped to spur art detectives and eventually the other two of John and Mark were also rediscovered.

In his 1989 catalog of the international Frans Hals exhibition, Slive included a detail of Hals' The Banquet of the Officers of the St Adrian Militia Company in 1627 with the head of Johan Damius to show that he was the probable model for St. Luke, though with a bit less hair.

Damius and Luke:

The four evangelists by Hals:

References

Paintings by Frans Hals
Ukrainian art
1625 paintings
Paintings in Ukraine
Hals
Books in art
Cattle in art